Black Narcissus is a British drama serial, based on the 1939 novel of the same name by Rumer Godden. The series features one of the final performances of Diana Rigg, who died in September 2020. The drama premiered on November 23, 2020, on FX in the US, and on December 27, 2020, on BBC One in the UK.

Premise
An Anglican nun sent to establish a branch of her order with her fellow sisters in the Himalayas struggles to temper her attractions to a World War I veteran they meet.

Cast

Episodes

Production
In October 2019, filming began on a new three part drama loosely based on the 1939 Rumer Godden novel, which was also adapted into the film Black Narcissus (1947), featuring Deborah Kerr as Sister Clodagh.

The drama is a co-production between the BBC and FX. Alessandro Nivola and Gemma Arterton star in the series, with Amanda Coe writing the screenplay and Charlotte Bruus Christensen directing all three episodes. Filming took place in Jomsom, Nepal, and at Pinewood Studios. The drama premiered on November 23, 2020, on FX.

Release
The series premiered on November 23, 2020, on FX in the United States, and on December 27, 2020, on BBC One in the United Kingdom. In selected international territories, the series was released on Disney+ under the dedicated streaming hub Star as an original series, on March 5, 2021.

In New Zealand, the series is distributed by Sky's streaming platform Neon.

Reception
For the miniseries, Rotten Tomatoes reported an approval rating of 53% based on 19 critic reviews, with an average rating of 5.69/10. The critics consensus reads "Black Narcissus doesn't quite escape the shadow of its cinematic forebear, but this miniseries sufficiently keeps the faith with excellent performances and visual splendor." Metacritic gave the miniseries a weighted average score of 67 out of 100 based on 12 critic reviews, indicating "generally favorable reviews".

The series was reviewed for The Guardian by Lucy Mangan who gave it three stars and called it "erotic, gothic – and totally unconvincing" and Anita Singh for The Telegraph gave it four stars reporting the first episode as "the hills are alive with the sound of sexually-charged nuns".

See also
 Black Narcissus (1947 film)

References

External links
 official site at FX

2020 British television series debuts
2020 British television series endings
2020s British television miniseries
2020s British drama television series
BBC television dramas
English-language television shows
FX Networks original programming
Television shows based on British novels
Television series by 20th Century Fox Television
Television shows filmed at Pinewood Studios